The 2007-2008 ABA season was the seventh season of the American Basketball Association that lasted from November 2008 and ended with the championship game in March 2009 between the Vermont Frost Heaves and the San Diego Wildcats. The Vermont Frost Heaves won their league-best second title after defeating the Wildcats, 87-84.

The 2007-2008 season haunted the league, as nearly twenty teams folded in the season's first five weeks, and many remaining at the end of the season, including the champion Frost Heaves, left the league for other existing ones.

Regular Season Standings
These are the final regular season standings, considering many teams folded during the year. (leading to few games being played for some teams)

Postseason

Wild card round
Vermont Frost Heaves (1) received bye to Bracket One Quarterfinal
Manchester Millrats (2) received bye to Bracket Two Quarterfinal
San Diego Wildcats (3) received bye to Bracket Two Quarterfinal
Texas Tycoons (4) received bye to Bracket One Quarterfinal
Quebec City Kebekwa (6) received bye to Bracket One Quarterfinal
Atlanta Vision (7) received bye to Bracket Two Quarterfinal
Long Beach Breakers (8) defeated Maywood Buzz (12) 120-102
Montreal Royal (9) received bye to Bracket Two Quarterfinal
Jersey Express (10) received bye to Bracket Two Quarterfinal
San Francisco Rumble (11) defeated Orange County Gladiators (5) 132-126

References

American Basketball Association (2000–present) seasons
ABA